Brickellia arguta is a North American species of flowering plant in the family Asteraceae known by the common name pungent brickellbush. It is native to the Mojave and Sonoran Deserts of California, Nevada, Arizona, and Baja California.

Brickellia arguta is a thickly branching shrub growing angled, glandular stems 2–4 meters (6–13 feet) in height. The rough, leathery leaves are oval in shape and up to 2 centimeters (8/10 inch) long. They are often sticky with resin glands. The inflorescences at the end of stem branches contain solitary flower heads, each about 1.5 centimeters long and lined with green, pointed phyllaries. At the tip of the head are 40 to 55 white, pinkish, or yellowish tubular disc florets. The fruit is a hairy cylindrical achene 4 millimeters long with a pappus of bristles.

References

External links
Jepson Manual Treatment
United States department of Agriculture Plants Profile
Calphotos Photo gallery, University of California

arguta
Flora of the Southwestern United States
Flora of the Sonoran Deserts
Flora of Baja California
Plants described in 1917